"Break Away (from That Boy)" is a song written by Louis "Dean" Mathis and Marcus F. Mathis and performed by The Newbeats.  It reached #7 in Australia, #15 in Canada, and #40 on the Billboard Hot 100 in 1965.  The song was also released in the United Kingdom as a single, but it did not chart.  The song was featured on their 1965 album, Big Beat Sounds by The Newbeats.

The song was produced by Wesley Rose.  The single's B-side, "Hey-O-Daddy-O", reached #118 on the US Billboard chart.

The song was re-released in 1970 as the B-side to the group's single, "Laura (What's He Got That I Ain't Got)".

References

1965 songs
1965 singles
The Newbeats songs